Sherry Lynn Calvert (born June 6, 1951, in Los Angeles, California) is a retired female javelin thrower from the United States, who represented her native country twice at the Summer Olympics: 1972 and 1976. She set her personal best (63.38 metres) in 1978.

International competitions

References

1951 births
Living people
American female javelin throwers
Track and field athletes from Los Angeles
Olympic track and field athletes of the United States
Athletes (track and field) at the 1972 Summer Olympics
Athletes (track and field) at the 1976 Summer Olympics
Pan American Games medalists in athletics (track and field)
Athletes (track and field) at the 1971 Pan American Games
Athletes (track and field) at the 1975 Pan American Games
Pan American Games gold medalists for the United States
Pan American Games silver medalists for the United States
Medalists at the 1971 Pan American Games
Medalists at the 1975 Pan American Games
21st-century American women